
Gmina Libiąż is an urban-rural gmina (administrative district) in Chrzanów County, Lesser Poland Voivodeship, in southern Poland.

Villages
Apart from the town of Libiąż, the gmina also contains the villages of Gromiec and Żarki.

Neighbouring gminas
Gmina Libiąż is bordered by the towns of Jaworzno and Oświęcim, and by the gminas of Babice, Chełmek, Chrzanów and Oświęcim.

References
Polish official population figures 2006

Libiaz
Chrzanów County